Indigo Renderer is a 3D rendering software that uses unbiased rendering technologies to create photo-realistic images. In doing so, it uses equations that simulate the behaviour of light. By simulating the interactions of light, it can produce effects such as:

 Depth of field, as when a camera is focused on one object and the background is blurred
 Spectral effects, as when a beam of light goes through a prism and a rainbow of colours is produced
 Refraction, as when light enters a pool of water and the objects in the pool seem to be "bent"
 Reflections, from subtle reflections on a polished concrete floor to the pure reflection of a silvered mirror
 Caustics, as in light that has been focused through a magnifying glass and has made a pattern of brightness on a surface

It uses methods such as Metropolis light transport (MLT), spectral light calculus, and virtual camera model. Scene data is stored in XML or IGS format.

It features Monte-Carlo path tracing,  bidirectional path tracing and MLT on top of bidirectional path tracing, distributed render capabilities, and progressive rendering (image gradually becomes less noisy as rendering progresses). It also supports subsurface scattering and has its own image format (.igi). 

It was originally released as freeware until the 2.0 release, when it became a commercial product. The Indigo 3 series introduced features such as real-time editing capabilities, while version 4 of the software adds pure GPU rendering through a vendor neutral OpenCL path tracing engine.

References

External links

 
 Glare Technologies website

Global illumination software
Rendering systems
3D rendering software for Linux
Proprietary commercial software for Linux